Porongurup is a small village on the northern slopes of the mountain range in the Shire of Plantagenet in Western Australia.

The name is derived from the Aboriginal place-name, and consequently arrived with no spelling as such. A common alternate spelling is Porongorup and while some maps still show this spelling, state government signs around the town use "Porongurup", as does the promotion association for the region.

The mountain range includes Castle Rock, a popular climbing destination, and the Devils Slide.

Industry
The main industry in the region is dairying, but there are some vegetable crops grown as well. Tourism based on the Porongurup Range's giant karri forests is limited by the difficulty of access because the nearest public transport is in Albany or Mount Barker.

The Granite Skywalk, a suspended walkway that spirals around the granite outcrop of Castle Rock, in Porongurup National Park in 2011.

As with other parts of the lower Great Southern region of Western Australia, silviculture, specifically plantations of Tasmanian blue gums (Eucalyptus globulus), is becoming a notable, and sometimes controversial, industry in Porongurup.

Viticulture is a relatively young but flourishing industry in the region with eleven local wineries listed on the Porongurup Promotion Association web-page . The Porongurup Wine Festival is held at a different local winery each year in March.

Another increasingly popular annual event is "Art in the Park", an outdoor sculpture competition in the  picnic area on Castle Rock Road in the national park. The week-long event is held in April and attracts a diverse range of traditional and contemporary works vying for cash prizes.

Wine region
Porongurup is the fifth of the subregions of Great Southern, somewhat untidily locking into Mount Barker on its western boundary. Eucalypt forest and rounded granite knobs and boulders give way to views out over the stirlings in one part, and towards Esperance in another.

Environment
In July and August 2006 eight noisy scrubbirds were released in the Porongurup Range by the Department of Environment and Conservation, Western Australia, as part of a trans-location program for the conservation of this endangered species.

History

The fire spread along the rear boundaries of several properties and into the national park. Fire crews helped prevent the fire spreading to nearby housing throughout Sunday night but on Monday afternoon (12 February) it jumped Porongurup-Mt Barker Road and spread into private property to the north-east of the village centre. One private residence and a number of farm sheds and buildings were destroyed and other buildings seriously damaged in the fire. Fire crews, including aerial support from six water bomber planes, battled the blaze and by Tuesday morning it was effectively under control. By Wednesday morning (14 February) the fire had burnt through around 95% of the national park and several farms and wineries showed the scars of the fire.

It was reportedly the most devastating fire in the region since the 1960s. Less than a week after the fire began, a committee was formed to take charge of remedial work in the community and in a show of resilience, local wineries still held their annual wine festival a few weeks later. Despite the national park remaining closed to visitors, the annual Art in the Park exhibition was allowed to go ahead in early April.

Sections of the park, including the Castle Rock walk trail and the Tree in The Rock picnic area, were reopened to the general public in September 2007.

References

External links
 Porongurup Promotions Association Inc.
 Friends of the Porongurup
 Thorn's Mountain Retreats

Towns in Western Australia
Great Southern (Western Australia)